Mimoblennius is a genus of combtooth blennies found in the Indian ocean and the western Pacific ocean.

Species
 Mimoblennius atrocinctus (Regan, 1909) (Banded blenny)
 Mimoblennius cas V. G. Springer & Spreitzer, 1978
 Mimoblennius cirrosus Smith-Vaniz & V. G. Springer, 1971 (Fringed blenny)
 Mimoblennius lineathorax R. Fricke, 1999
 Mimoblennius rusi V. G. Springer & Spreitzer, 1978 (Rusi blenny)

References

 
Salarinae
Taxa named by Victor G. Springer
Marine fish genera